This is a list of Category A listed buildings in Glasgow, Scotland.

In Scotland, the term listed building refers to a building or other structure officially designated as being of "special architectural or historic interest".  Category A structures are those considered to be "buildings of national or international importance, either architectural or historic, or fine little-altered examples of some particular period, style or building type." Listing was begun by a provision in the Town and Country Planning (Scotland) Act 1947, and the current legislative basis for listing is the Planning (Listed Buildings and Conservation Areas) (Scotland) Act 1997.  The authority for listing rests with Historic Scotland, an executive agency of the Scottish Government, which inherited this role from the Scottish Development Department in 1991. Once listed, severe restrictions are imposed on the modifications allowed to a building's structure or its fittings. Listed building consent must be obtained from local authorities prior to any alteration to such a structure. There are approximately 47,400 listed buildings in Scotland, of which around 8% (some 3,800) are Category A.

The medieval city of Glasgow formed around two axes, that of the High Street and the Saltmarket which was bisected by Trongate and Gallowgate at Glasgow Cross.  Despite its ancient origins very little of the medieval fabric of the city survives. Only two buildings from the earliest period are extant in Glasgow; the Cathedral and the former canon’s house. Nor do the riggs and wynds of the old city remain, though a great deal of the original street pattern has persisted down the centuries. Additionally, a mere handful of buildings from the period between the Reformation and the end of the eighteenth century have come down to us. The majority of the city’s building stock, then, is nineteenth century when the population of Glasgow rose from c. 78,000 in 1801 to 770,000 in 1901. The pattern of expansion can be traced from the commercial centre of the High Street and Merchant City westwards to the Blythswood Hill New Town laid out in the 1820s and 30s, and south of the river in Laurieston and Tradeston. The feus of both these developments were, unusually for the British Isles, laid out on a gridiron pattern. Further development came with the construction of the Woodlands and Park District areas, the latter of which was the work of Charles Wilson, in the 1830s and 40s. With the relocation of the University from the High street to Gilmorehill in the 1860s came the expansion of the city to the west where suburbs at Dowanhill and Partickhill were laid out on the garden principal with villas and cottages in a number of styles. Similarly, the coming of the railways and trams permitted the development of the suburbs of Pollokshields and Langside to the south. In 1866 the city corporation established the City Improvement Trust to control planning and clear slums. The outlying burghs were amalgamated into the City Corporation in 1891 and in the following decades the city witnessed its peak population of circa 1.1 million. With the post-war period came the proposals of the Bruce Plan in 1945 and the Clyde Valley Report in 1946. The former recommended the phased replacement of the entire city centre and its encirclement with a ring-road, of which scheme only the M8 at Charing Cross and Anderston was completed. The latter advised the displacement of the population of the City centre to New Towns and peripheral estates which led to the contraction of the city’s population and the wholesale redevelopment of areas such as the Gorbals and Townhead.

The architectural character of Glasgow has been described as follows: “[t]he architecture of the City Centre exhibits a distinctive confidence from the late 18th century into the 21st century that makes it unique in Scotland. Although a variety of architectural styles exist, there are certain Glasgow characteristics: depth of modelling; wealth of ornamentation and sculpture; animated roofline; and consistent building lines and predominantly flat (not stepped or curved) linear elevations along the backs of the pavements. Glasgow architects and engineers were, and remain, frequent pioneers of new building technology and materials.” Perhaps the most striking quality of Glasgow’s urban form is the eclectic mix of styles which it exhibits. Of those belonging to the early nineteenth century include: the neoclassicism of William Stark and David Hamilton; a vigorous tradition of Greek Revival, possibly the longest lasting in Britain, which persisted down to the 1890s; Italianate evidenced in the Western Club and Rochead’s 2 St Vincent St.; and Gothic Revival notably practised by Leiper and G. Gilbert Scott. By the mid-century Glasgow had produced its first native architect of national and later international importance in Alexander Thomson, whose eclectic historicism produced its own school. Later nineteenth-century work includes the art nouveau inspired buildings of James Salmon, particularly the “Hatrack” on St Vincent St.; the Beaux arts style common to many public buildings of the period especially the City Chambers; Mackintosh’s art and crafts inflected work; Edwardian Baroque revival; and the distinctive free Glasgow Style of Millar and the later Salmon. The inter-war period sees the use of Art Deco and some reference to the Chicago Style in the elevator buildings demanded by commerce of the time, specifically in James Miller’s St Vincent St. Bank of Scotland and 98 West George Street. Post-war there is the creative application of Functionalism in the work of Jack Coia and Brutalism elsewhere in the city’s redevelopment. The best of Glasgow's historic architecture was metropolitan in its ambition, as the Buildings of Scotland remarks: “A visitor with time to spare will find that the city centre is rich with remarkable buildings from the height of its industrial prosperity and that its grandest suburbs are planned on a scale comparable with many European capitals.”

Listed buildings 

|}

See also

 List of listed buildings in Glasgow 
 Scheduled monuments in Glasgow
 Architecture of Glasgow

Notes

References

Bibliography
William A. Brogden (ed), The Neo-classical Town: Scottish Contributions to Urban Design Since 1750, Rutland Press, 1996
A.M. Doak, D. Walker, Glasgow at a Glance: an Architectural Handbook, Collins, 1965
Glasgow Central Conservation Area Appraisal, City Design Group, Development & Regeneration Services, Glasgow City Council, 2012, (PDF)
A. Gomme, D. Walker, Architecture of Glasgow, Lund Humphries, 1968
Henry-Russell Hitchcock,  Early Victorian Architecture in Britain, Yale, 1954
John R. Hume, Industrial Archaeology of Glasgow, Blackie & Son, 1974
Deborah Mays, The Architecture of Scottish Cities, Tuckwell Press, 2001
Ronald McFadzean, Life and Work of Alexander Thomson, Routledge, 1979
Charles McKean, Central Glasgow - an Illustrated Architectural Guide, Mainstream Publishing, 1989
Ray McKenzie, Public Sculpture of Glasgow, Liverpool University Press, 2002
Peter Reed, Glasgow: The Forming of The City, Edinburgh University Press, 1999
Sam Small, Greater Glasgow: An Illustrated Architectural Guide, The Royal Incorporation of Architects in Scotland, 2008.
Robin Ward, Exploring Glasgow: The Architectural Guide, Birlinn, 2017
Elizabeth Williamson, Anne Riches,  Malcolm Higgs, Buildings of Scotland: Glasgow, Yale, 1990
F. Worsdall, Victorian City, Richard Drew, 1982
Frank Worsdall, The Tenement: A Way of Life, Chambers, 1979

Glasgow
A
Category A listed buildings
Category A listed buildings in Glasgow